The Baháʼí administration or Baháʼí administrative order is the administrative system of the Baháʼí Faith. It has two arms, the elected and the appointed. The supreme governing institution of the Baháʼí Faith is the Universal House of Justice, situated in Haifa, Israel.

Some features set apart the Baháʼí administration from similar systems of human government: elected representatives should follow their conscience, rather than being responsible to the views of electors; political campaigning, nominations and parties are prohibited; and religious authority was passed down from its founder to the Universal House of Justice.

The Baháʼí administration has four charter documents,
the Kitáb-i-Aqdas, the Tablets of the Divine Plan, the Tablet of Carmel and the Will and Testament of ʻAbdu'l-Bahá.

Character of Baháʼí administration
Shoghi Effendi wrote that the Baháʼí Administrative Order incorporates within its structure certain elements which are to be found in each of the three recognized forms of secular government: autocracy, aristocracy and democracy. His objective in effectively designing the Baháʼí Administrative Order was to embody, reconcile and assimilate within it "such wholesome elements as are to be found in each one of them..." while excluding the "admitted evils inherent in each of these systems..." such that it "cannot ever degenerate into any form of despotism, of oligarchy, or of demagogy which must sooner or later corrupt the machinery of all man-made and essentially defective political institutions."

Baháʼu'lláh commended the British system of government that enhanced kingship through consultation with the people, but did not specifically endorse parliamentary democracy.

These statements praise the principles of kingship and consultation with the people as principles for civil government. The Baháʼí Administrative Order concerns the system of administration within the Baháʼí Faith rather than civil government. This difference is highlighted in a letter written on behalf of Shoghi Effendi concerning the future world government foretold by Baháʼu'lláh and outlined by Shoghi Effendi, stating "As regards the International Executive referred to by the Guardian in his "Goal of a New World Order", this statement refers by no means to the Baháʼí Commonwealth of the future, but simply to that world government which will herald the advent and lead to the final establishment of the World Order of Baháʼu'lláh. The formation of this International Executive, which corresponds to the executive head or board in present-day national governments, is but a step leading to the Baháʼí world government of the future, and hence should not be identified with either the institution of the Guardianship or that of the International House of Justice." In keeping with the Baháʼí principle of obedience to government, Baháʼí Administration is seen as subordinate to civil government.

Amanda Ripley, professional long form journalist since 2004 for Time magazine, 2009 for The Atlantic, and onward through other major news outlets, in her 2021 book High Conflict: why we get trapped and how we get out, describes the Bahá'í administration electoral and system of governance saying "…everything about these elections is designed to reduce the odds of high conflict." indeed that "The Bahá'ís try to select people who do not crave attention and power." and "In every meeting, they follow a protocol called 'consultation,' and it’s designed to allow people to speak their mind without getting too attached to their own brilliance." In Ripley's summation "If social scientists designed a religion, it would look like this.… In this way, Baha’i elections are … designed to exploit the human capacity for cooperation, rather than competition."

Bahá'í consultation
A key point of the process of administration is the practice of consultation. ʻAbdu'l-Bahá states "The prime requisites for them that take counsel together are purity of motive, radiance of spirit, detachment from all else save God, attraction to His Divine Fragrances, humility and lowliness amongst His loved ones, patience and long-suffering in difficulties and servitude... The members thereof must take counsel together in such wise that no occasion for ill-feeling or discord may arise. This can be attained when every member expresseth with absolute freedom his own opinion and setteth forth his argument. Should any one oppose, he must on no account feel hurt for not until matters are fully discussed can the right way be revealed. The shining spark of truth cometh forth only after the clash of differing opinions. If after discussion, a decision be carried unanimously, well and good; but if the Lord forbid, differences of opinion should arise, a majority of voices must prevail."

Structure

The Baháʼí administration has two distinct elements: the elected and appointed. The highest elected body is the Universal House of Justice, which possesses the authority to supplement and apply the laws of Baháʼu'lláh. The highest appointed authority is the Institution of the Guardianship, which is a hereditary authority and has the exclusive "right of the interpretation of the Holy Writ solely conferred upon him." (God Passes By) These two institutions are described in ʻAbdu'l-Bahá's Will and Testament as having divine authority:
"...The Guardian of the Cause of God, as well as the Universal House of Justice to be universally elected and established, are both under the care and protection of the Abhá Beauty... Whatsoever they decide is of God. Whoso obeyeth him not, neither obeyeth them, hath not obeyed God"

The same Will appoints Shoghi Effendi as the Guardian, and gives further details about the structure of the administration, including election and appointment processes. Shoghi Effendi worked throughout his life to establish the necessary secondary institutions that were required for the election of the Universal House of Justice, which was first elected in 1963.

Having no ordained, professional priesthood, Baháʼís operate through a type of non-partisan democratic self-government. The traditional functions of community leadership and moral leadership are not vested in individuals, but in an institutional framework with two main branches.

Elected institutions
Sometimes referred to by Baháʼu'lláh as "the Rulers", Baháʼís elect members to councils which are vested with the authority of the community. The members of these councils, themselves, have no individual authority. When duly constituted, however, and specifically when deciding matters as a body, these councils act as the heads of the community. Baháʼu'lláh envisioned a Supreme House of Justice, with local Houses of Justice in every community where nine or more adult Baháʼís reside. ʻAbdu'l-Bahá unveiled the "Secondary", or National House of Justice in his will. Seen as embryonic institutions, national and local Houses of Justice are currently given the temporary appellation of "Spiritual Assemblies" and are expected, over time, to mature into fully functional Houses of Justice.

The Universal House of Justice is seen as morally infallible, though this belief has subtleties, in that the Universal House of Justice can both make new Baháʼí law and repeal its own laws. It may not alter the scriptural laws defined by Baháʼu'lláh and ʻAbdu'l-Bahá. National and Local Spiritual Assemblies are seen as requiring deference and obedience, but can be overruled by a superior elected institution. All decisions by these bodies must be made, and are considered valid if, and only if the body is duly constituted, and meeting as a body with a quorum of members present. These decisions are made through a specific process of consultation.

Universal House of Justice
The Universal House of Justice is the supreme governing body of the Baháʼí Faith. The Baháʼí writings affirm that its decisions are "the source of all good and freed from all error". It is elected every five years, and currently sitting members of all National Spiritual Assemblies act as delegates to its election.

National Spiritual Assemblies
A National Spiritual Assembly (NSA) normally represents a country, although sometimes regions are assigned their own NSA (e.g. Alaska). Sometimes several countries are grouped together into a single Assembly, for instance the Baltic States, or (originally) Canada and the United States. These boundaries are subject to the discretion of the Universal House of Justice, and can obviously change, Canada and the USA now having their own individual National Assemblies. These assemblies are elected annually through locally elected delegates.

Regional Baháʼí Councils
Regional Baháʼí Councils (RBC) have also been established in several larger national Baháʼí communities. They act under the direction of a National Spiritual Assembly and are elected by members of the local Spiritual Assemblies in their jurisdiction. They are increasingly taking on community growth and development activities, and provide guidance and structure for local communities' coordination on these.

Local Spiritual Assemblies
A Local Spiritual Assembly (LSA) represents a town, city, or county, and are elected annually by direct election. If a locality only has nine Baháʼís, then no election process is necessary. The Local Assemblies govern Baháʼí community life at the local level, and administer the affairs of the entire community, including coordinating the Nineteen Day Feast, holy day observances, funeral services, marriage counselling and many other tasks, though these are generally done through committee appointment.

Appointed institutions
Baháʼu'lláh makes reference to "the learned" among his people. The functions of this branch were originally carried out by the Hands of the Cause of God appointed by Baháʼu'lláh, ʻAbdu'l-Bahá, and Shoghi Effendi. When it was determined that no more "Hands" could be appointed, the Universal House of Justice formed the Institution of the Counsellors to fulfill their duties. The appointed members act as individuals. While they have no authority to command or rule on matters, they are "the learned" and individuals and institutions are morally obliged to consider their opinions. These individuals inspire, encourage, enjoin, and make the community aware of relevant scripture and guidance from the central institutions. Their function is loosely defined, though their duties are divided into the two general categories of protection and propagation of the Baháʼí Faith. The learned have a similar geographic hierarchy.

International Counsellors
The International Counsellors are nine individuals appointed to the International Teaching Centre, which is a body that directly assists the Universal House of Justice at the Baháʼí World Centre. They advise Baháʼís at the international level and coordinate the efforts of the Continental Counsellors.

Continental Counsellors
Individual Counsellors are assigned to Continental Boards, where they interact directly with several National Spiritual Assemblies. They often act in an informational capacity, communicating the direction and discussions at the World Centre to national communities. They will often focus their work on one or a set of countries within their jurisdiction.

Auxiliary Boards
Auxiliary Boards are appointed by the Continental Counsellors to assist them on a smaller geographic scale. They work with any Local Spiritual Assemblies, Regional Councils, and individuals within their jurisdiction. There are typically two Boards in a single geographical region, one responsible for protection, and one for propagation of the community, though these functions often overlap. Both Boards report to the Continental Board that appointed them, regardless of their focus.

Assistants
Auxiliary Board members appoint "assistants" that operate on their behalf at the grassroots level. These assistants often meet with Local Spiritual Assemblies, speak at events, and are sought for advice by individual community members. They will sometimes have a very localized mandate, such as to focus on youth in a particular city, or they can be appointed broadly. Their role is as flexible as their Auxiliary Board member feels is appropriate.

Recent developments
While most of the above have been in place for decades or more, in recent years with the institution of the Baháʼí training institute process a number of other possible positions have been named: Regional Institute Boards, Area Teaching Committees, Cluster Growth Facilitators, Cluster Institute Coordinators, Cluster Junior Youth Spiritual Empowerment Programme Coordinators, and Cluster Children's Class Coordinator being examples.

Bahá'í Internet Agency 
Based in the United States, this agency was created by the Universal House of Justice to assist the Counsellors and National Spiritual Assemblies in addressing issues related to the propagation and protection of the Bahá'í Faith on the Internet. BIA is supervised by the International Teaching Centre. It has a full-time director.

Elections

Baháʼís consider their electoral process to be a sacred act, essential to the health of the community. Great effort is spent on organizing elections to meet with the exacting standards set by Shoghi Effendi.

Method
Baháʼí elections use what is described as a three-stage councilor-republican system to determine electors. Who the electors are and who the eligible members are depends on the scope of the election. At all levels, only residents within the jurisdiction of the body being elected are eligible for membership. In general, adult Baháʼís in good standing resident in the jurisdiction are both the electorate (either directly or through delegation) as well as the pool of potential members to serve on the body being elected.

Voting itself is held using a system similar to the multiple member first past the post voting system. In the typical case, there are nine members on an Assembly or House of Justice, and therefore voters vote for nine individuals. Electors write the individual names of exactly nine eligible Baháʼís, without repeating. The nine Baháʼís with the most votes are elected. In cases of tie votes for the ninth-least-populous vote (for example), a run-off election is held (unless one of the tied candidates is a member of a minority in the community and is deemed elected).

Baháʼí elections do not include any sort of constituency for members – all members are considered to be at-large. Members are chosen by the electorate based on Shoghi Effendi's stated criteria consisting of five qualities:
"Let us recall His explicit and often-repeated assurance that every Assembly elected in that rarefied atmosphere of selflessness and detachment is in truth, appointed of God, that its verdict is truly inspired, that one and all should submit to its decision unreservedly and with cheerfulness ... the elector ... is called upon to vote for none but those whom prayer and reflection have inspired him to uphold... Hence it is incumbent upon the chosen delegates to consider without the least trace of passion and prejudice, and irrespective of any material consideration, the names of only those who can best combine the necessary qualities of unquestioned loyalty, of selfless devotion, of a well-trained mind, of recognized ability and mature experience... Nothing short of the all-encompassing, all-pervading power of His Guidance and Love can enable this newly enfolded order to gather strength and flourish amid the storm and stress of a turbulent age, and in the fullness of time vindicate its high claim to be universally recognized as the one Haven of abiding felicity and peace."

The Universal House of Justice further clarified that the elector, having determined those who meet these qualifications, should give "due consideration. . . to such other factors as age distribution, diversity, and gender."

Non-partisanship
Shoghi Effendi sternly deprecated partisan politics and certain other practices current in western democracies, such as campaigning and nomination. As a result:
Nominations and campaigning are prohibited. Baháʼís should not seek to promote themselves as candidates.
Voters are urged not to consult with each other about the suitability of individuals.
Voters are strongly encouraged to study and discuss, in abstract, the qualities named by Shoghi Effendi as being necessary in those elected to serve, without reference to individuals.
Individuals should be selected only on the basis of their qualities, without reference to material means or other characteristics, except insofar as they provide insight into their qualities.
Those elected are expected to serve, though, in cases of extreme personal difficulty, such a member may request that the body to which they are elected excuse him or her.
In the event of a tying vote for the last places, if one of these individuals is a member of a minority, this individual is automatically awarded the position. (In the US, this refers to racial minority.) If this is unclear, or if there is disagreement as to whether the minority rule applies, a run-off election is held in which votes are cast only for one of those tied.

Shoghi Effendi saw these (and other) aspects as essential to preserving the full rights and prerogatives of the electors, guarding them against manipulation.

Electoral scope

Local or regional
At the local (city, town, county) level of administration, the nine-member Local Spiritual Assembly is elected by adult Baháʼís in that particular locality once a year during their Annual General Meeting on the First Day of the Ridvan Festival (the 13th day of the month of Glory, about 20 or 21 April).

In the United States, Canada, and India, Regional Councils are elected by members of these Local Spiritual Assemblies in an election often conducted by mail. Again, no nominations occur, and each Local Spiritual Assembly member is directed to vote for those individuals who are resident in the region they feel are best suited to serve.

National
The selection of the National Spiritual Assembly is indirect using an electoral-unit delegation method. The nation is divided into voting districts or units. In each district the members are charged with selecting one or more delegates who will attend the annual national convention and vote for the members of the National Spiritual Assembly. The members at the local level are free to vote for any adult Bahaʼi(s) in the district or unit in good standing, keeping in mind the guidance from Shoghi Effendi that the individuals should, "combine the necessary qualities of unquestioned loyalty, of selfless devotion, of a well-trained mind, of recognized ability and mature experience..." The delegates elected at the local level have two principal duties to carry out at the national convention – to elect the National Spiritual Assembly and to make recommendations to that body on issues relevant to it.  In a process parallel to the one at the local level, the delegates to the national convention are free to vote for the nine individuals who they feel will best carry out the duties of the National Spiritual Assembly. They are also free to voice any relevant concerns they have to the delegation and to the outgoing and incoming Assemblies. While the delegates can certainly convey to the convention the concerns of those in their district, they are in no way obligated to represent those who elected them. In addition, no input is provided to the delegates, either at the local or national levels, on whom to vote for in the national election.

Global
Every five years from 1963, members of all National Spiritual Assemblies are called to vote at an International Convention at the Baháʼí World Centre in Haifa, Israel for members of the Universal House of Justice. These members act as delegates in a manner similar to National Baháʼí elections. Those who are unable to attend send postal ballots.

Service on multiple institutions
Baháʼís may, depending on circumstances, serve on multiple institutions. Members of National Spiritual Assemblies have served on Local Spiritual Assemblies, and assistants within the appointed institutions may serve on Local Spiritual Assemblies. However, beyond this there are several practical limitations. National Spiritual Assemblies may ask Local Spiritual Assemblies to excuse those who are members of both bodies from executive positions, to free their time to do the work of that National Spiritual Assemblies. Members of the Auxiliary Boards appointed by the Counsellors who are elected to such an institution are asked to choose to serve either in their elected or appointed capacity, but not both. Members of the Universal House of Justice do not simultaneously serve on other elected bodies, though this may not be a formal policy.

History

During Baháʼu'lláh's lifetime
The earliest depiction of the administration currently at work within the worldwide Baháʼí community can be found in the writings of Baháʼu'lláh. Founded upon the belief that God guides humanity through messengers, many of whom have prophesied a "Kingdom of Heaven on earth", and the belief that Baháʼu'lláh's revelation is the fulfillment of such prophesies, Baháʼís see in his writings a system both of God and of the people.

Though Baháʼu'lláh intimated, earlier, many of the policies that would form the basis of the Baháʼí administrative system, his Kitáb-i-Aqdas provides the most solid initial glimpse of this system:

"The Lord hath ordained that in every city a House of Justice be established wherein shall gather counsellors to the number of Bahá, and should it exceed this number it doth not matter. They should consider themselves as entering the Court of the presence of God, the Exalted, the Most High, and as beholding Him Who is the Unseen. It behoveth them to be the trusted ones of the Merciful among men and to regard themselves as the guardians appointed of God for all that dwell on earth. It is incumbent upon them to take counsel together and to have regard for the interests of the servants of God, for His sake, even as they regard their own interests, and to choose that which is meet and seemly. Thus hath the Lord your God commanded you. Beware lest ye put away that which is clearly revealed in His Tablet. Fear God, O ye that perceive."

This House of Justice is described as being in concert with Baha'u'llah and the Aghsán, his descendants, but with the responsibility for creating and abrogating laws not explicitly revealed in the sacred scripture.

Over time, these concepts were clarified initially in Baháʼu'lláh's writings, and then in those of his eldest son and successor, ʻAbdu'l-Bahá.

ʻAbdu'l-Bahá's ministry
It was ʻAbdu'l-Bahá who clarified the differing roles of Supreme/Universal (global) vs. the local Houses of Justice. During ʻAbdu'l-Bahá's life, he oversaw and encouraged the establishment of many elected local councils, calling them "Spiritual Assemblies". He wrote many clarifying letters, giving instructions to various Spiritual Assemblies, inspiring the Baháʼí world. The Tablets of the Divine Plan stand out, however, and formed a great part of the early goal setting and planning processes of the nascent spiritual community. This plan opened up whole new geographic regions to the Baháʼís, ʻAbdu'l-Bahá encouraging Baháʼís to connect with the peoples of all races and cultures.

One of his greatest legacies to the development of the Baháʼí administrative system, however, was his will and testament, wherein he describes several new institutions. Clarifying Baháʼu'lláh's comments about his descendants and authority, he described the Institution of the Guardianship, which he saw as functioning in concert with the Universal House of Justice – one bearing responsibility for interpretation of scripture, the other as legislator of new law not covered by existing scripture. To these he commanded the obedience of the Baháʼís.

"The sacred and youthful branch, the Guardian of the Cause of God, as well as the Universal House of Justice to be universally elected and established, are both under the care and protection of the Abhá Beauty, under the shelter and unerring guidance of the Exalted One (may my life be offered up for them both). Whatsoever they decide is of God. Whoso obeyeth him not, neither obeyeth them, hath not obeyed God; whoso rebelleth against him and against them hath rebelled against God; whoso opposeth him hath opposed God; whoso contendeth with them hath contended with God; whoso disputeth with him hath disputed with God"

In this document, ʻAbdu'l-Bahá also:
 appointed his grandson Shoghi Effendi as the Guardian of the Cause of God
 established criteria for the appointment of future Guardians.
 defined a new scope of elected institution he called the "Secondary House of Justice", the first of which were elected under the administration of Shoghi Effendi.
 enjoined the believers to shun Covenant-breakers – Baháʼís who opposed the head of the faith and attempted to create a split or faction.
 defined some of the conditions for the future development of the Baháʼí administration.
 clarified the institution of the Hands of the Cause, and clarified the requirements for their appointment.

Shoghi Effendi's administration
Under Shoghi Effendi, the Baháʼí Faith underwent its most dramatic shift in shape and process. While evolving from the skeletal structure established by Baháʼu'lláh and ʻAbdu'l-Bahá, Shoghi Effendi instituted large-scale campaigns of administrative consolidation, established practices and procedures for Baháʼí administrative bodies, appointed more Hands of the Cause, secured the legal position of the Baháʼí Community both in Haifa, but also, working with newly formed National Spiritual Assemblies, with many national governments. Over this period, Baháʼí institutions and inter-institutional collaboration became clearer, many finer points of Baháʼí law were explained, and the faith was spread to most of the globe. Baháʼí marriages became recognized in their own right in several regions and the Baháʼí Faith was recognized as an independent religion by many nations and religious courts, including Islamic religious courts in Egypt. Shoghi Effendi described the death of ʻAbdu'l-Bahá and the start of his own administration as the end of the "Heroic age" and the start of the "Formative" age of the Baháʼí Faith.

After Shoghi Effendi

Shoghi Effendi died in 1957 with no children, and no will could be found. The 27 living Hands of the Cause, appointed for life by Shoghi Effendi and referred to by him as "the Chief Stewards of Baháʼu'lláh's embryonic World Commonwealth" signed a unanimous proclamation on 25 November 1957, shortly after the death of Shoghi Effendi, stating that he had died "without having appointed his successor", and leaving further decisions about the Guardianship to the Universal House of Justice which had yet to be elected. When, shortly after its ultimate election in 1963, this body examined the question of the succession of the Guardian it determined that there was no way to satisfy the provisions of the will and testament of ʻAbdu'l-Bahá, and that, therefore, no successor to the Shoghi Effendi could be named. Creating a constitution for itself that incorporated obedience to the body of Shoghi Effendi's writings, and to those of ʻAbdu'l-Bahá and Baháʼu'lláh, the Universal House of Justice assumed full authority over the affairs of the Baháʼí community.

In 1968, the Universal House of Justice, in collaboration with the Hands of the Cause of God determined that only a Guardian of the Cause could appoint the Hands of the Cause, and decided to create the Continental Boards of Counsellors, to continue and assist in the work of the Hands. In 1973 the International Teaching Centre was established and the Hands were instructed to act as liaisons between the Counsellors appointed to it and the House of Justice. That same year the Auxiliary Board members were authorized to name "assistants" to act on local levels. All Hands have since died.

Modern evolution
One hundred years after Baháʼu'lláh's death, the Baháʼís celebrated a "holy year", during which the fully authorized translation of the Kitáb-i-Aqdas (Most Holy Book) was published. Coinciding with this was a process of re-examination of intra-Baháʼí administrative and community action, the implementation of Baháʼí law in greater degrees among non-Iranian Baháʼís, and the maturation of the Spiritual Assemblies.

Through a series of plans, the Universal House of Justice refocused the Baháʼí community on community development, and systematization of best-practices, hoping to reduce the "boom and bust" cycles of community growth encountered in the previous century. The Baháʼí community began to incorporate more active service, socio-economic development efforts ballooned in number, and local and national communities became more focused on examining the needs of their wider non-Baháʼí communities, to see how the faith could aid them. The earliest days of the 21st century saw the Baháʼís begin to pare down their administrative structures, appoint fewer committees, and focus on very specific goals outlined by the Universal House of Justice – namely the creation of small grass-roots study groups, the creation of more neighbourhood-centric children's classes, and the increase in the spiritual character of the community through small devotional gatherings. The Baháʼís were encouraged not to see these "core activities" as simply Baháʼí activities. Rather, these were to be seen as activities which were open to the wider community, but would be characteristic of a Baháʼí's community life.

This period also saw the establishment of regional councils, who form a level of administrative action more specific than a National Spiritual Assembly, but broader than the civic locality, a boundary which almost always defines the jurisdictions of Local Spiritual Assembly. These seem to be evolving and assuming many growth and consolidation and educational functions of Local Spiritual Assemblies, allowing these local bodies to meet the more personal needs of their community members.

The present-day Baháʼí local, national and international communities experiment with community development methods, and seem to be attempting to harness the administrative structure to canalize grass-roots initiatives, rather than have higher institutions dictate highly specific plans and practices.

See also
New world order (Baháʼí)
Theodemocracy

Notes

References

Bahá'í institutions